In homological algebra and algebraic topology, a spectral sequence is a means of computing homology groups by taking successive approximations.

Discovery and motivation 

Motivated by problems in algebraic topology, Jean Leray introduced the notion of a sheaf and found himself faced with the problem of computing sheaf cohomology. To compute sheaf cohomology, Leray introduced a computational technique now known as the Leray spectral sequence. This gave a relation between cohomology groups of a sheaf and cohomology groups of the pushforward of the sheaf. The relation involved an infinite process. Leray found that the cohomology groups of the pushforward formed a natural chain complex, so that he could take the cohomology of the cohomology. This was still not the cohomology of the original sheaf, but it was one step closer in a sense. The cohomology of the cohomology again formed a chain complex, and its cohomology formed a chain complex, and so on. The limit of this infinite process was essentially the same as the cohomology groups of the original sheaf.

It was soon realized that Leray's computational technique was an example of a more general phenomenon. Spectral sequences were found in diverse situations, and they gave intricate relationships among homology and cohomology groups coming from geometric situations such as fibrations and from algebraic situations involving derived functors. While their theoretical importance has decreased since the introduction of derived categories, they are still the most effective computational tool available. This is true even when many of the terms of the spectral sequence are incalculable.

Unfortunately, because of the large amount of information carried in spectral sequences, they are difficult to grasp. This information is usually contained in a rank three lattice of abelian groups or modules. The easiest cases to deal with are those in which the spectral sequence eventually collapses, meaning that going out further in the sequence produces no new information. Even when this does not happen, it is often possible to get useful information from a spectral sequence by various tricks.

Formal definition

Cohomological spectral sequence 
Fix an abelian category, such as a category of modules over a ring, and a nonnegative integer . A cohomological spectral sequence is a sequence  of objects  and endomorphisms , such that for every 
 ,
Usually the isomorphisms are suppressed and we write  instead. An object  is called  sheet (as in a sheet of paper), or sometimes a page or a term; an endomorphism  is called boundary map or differential.

Bigraded spectral sequence  
In reality spectral sequences mostly occur in the category of doubly graded modules over a ring R (or doubly graded sheaves of modules over a sheaf of rings), i.e. every sheet is a bigraded R-module 
So in this case a cohomological spectral sequence is a sequence  of bigraded R-modules  and for every module the direct sum of endomorphisms  of bidegree , such that for every  it holds that:
 ,
 .
The notation used here is called  complementary degree. Some authors write   instead, where  is the total degree. Depending upon the spectral sequence, the boundary map on the first sheet can have a degree which corresponds to r = 0, r = 1, or r = 2. For example, for the spectral sequence of a filtered complex, described below, r0 = 0, but for the Grothendieck spectral sequence, r0 = 2. Usually r0 is zero, one, or two. In the ungraded situation described above, r0 is irrelevant.

Homological spectral sequence 
Mostly the objects we are talking about are chain complexes, that occur with descending (like above) or ascending order.

Spectral sequence from a chain complex 
The most elementary example in the ungraded situation is a chain complex C•. An object C• in an abelian category of chain complexes naturally comes with a differential d.  Let r0 = 0, and let E0 be C•. This forces E1 to be the complex H(C•): At the i'th location this is the i'th homology group of C•. The only natural differential on this new complex is the zero map, so we let d1 = 0. This forces  to equal , and again our only natural differential is the zero map. Putting the zero differential on all the rest of our sheets gives a spectral sequence whose terms are:

 E0 = C•
 Er = H(C•) for all r ≥ 1.

The terms of this spectral sequence stabilize at the first sheet because its only nontrivial differential was on the zeroth sheet. Consequently, we can get no more information at later steps.

Visualization 

A doubly graded spectral sequence has a tremendous amount of data to keep track of, but there is a common visualization technique which makes the structure of the spectral sequence clearer. We have three indices, r, p, and q. An object  can be seen as the  checkered page of a book. On these sheets, we will take p to be the horizontal direction and q to be the vertical direction. At each lattice point we have the object . Now turning to the next page means taking homology, that is the  page is a subquotient of the  page. The total degree n = p + q runs diagonally, northwest to southeast, across each sheet. In the homological case, the differentials have bidegree (−r, r − 1), so they decrease n by one. In the cohomological case, n is increased by one. The differentials change their direction with each turn with respect to r.

The red arrows demonstrate the case of a first quadrant sequence (see example below), where only the objects of the first quadrant are non-zero. While turning pages, either the domain or the codomain of all the differentials become zero.

Properties

Categorical properties 
The set of cohomological spectral sequences form a category: a morphism of spectral sequences  is by definition a collection of maps  which are compatible with the differentials, i.e. , and with the given isomorphisms between the cohomology of the rth step and the (r+1)th sheets of E and E' , respectively: . In the bigraded case, they should also respect the graduation:

Multiplicative structure 
A cup product gives a ring structure to a cohomology group, turning it into a cohomology ring. Thus, it is natural to consider a spectral sequence with a ring structure as well. Let  be a spectral sequence of cohomological type.

A typical example is the cohomological Serre spectral sequence for a fibration , when the coefficient group is a ring R. It has the multiplicative structure induced by the cup products of fibre and base on the -page. However, in general the limiting term  is not isomorphic as a graded algebra to H(E; R). The multiplicative structure can be very useful for calculating differentials on the sequence.

Constructions of spectral sequences 
Spectral sequences can be constructed by various ways. In algebraic topology, an exact couple is perhaps the most common tool for the construction. In algebraic geometry, spectral sequences are usually constructed from filtrations of cochain complexes.

Spectral sequence of an exact couple 

 
Another technique for constructing spectral sequences is William Massey's method of exact couples.  Exact couples are particularly common in algebraic topology. Despite this they are unpopular in abstract algebra, where most spectral sequences come from filtered complexes.

To define exact couples, we begin again with an abelian category. As before, in practice this is usually the category of doubly graded modules over a ring.  An exact couple is a pair of objects (A, C), together with three homomorphisms between these objects: f : A → A, g : A → C and h : C → A subject to certain exactness conditions:

Image f = Kernel g
Image g = Kernel h
Image h = Kernel f

We will abbreviate this data by (A, C, f, g, h).  Exact couples are usually depicted as triangles.  We will see that C corresponds to the E0 term of the spectral sequence and that A is some auxiliary data.

To pass to the next sheet of the spectral sequence, we will form the derived couple.  We set:

d = g o h
A' = f(A)
C' = Ker d / Im d
f' = f|A', the restriction of f to A'
h' : C' → A' is induced by h.  It is straightforward to see that h induces such a map.
g' : A' → C' is defined on elements as follows: For each a in A', write a as f(b) for some b in A.  g'(a) is defined to be the image of g(b) in C'. In general, g' can be constructed using one of the embedding theorems for abelian categories.

From here it is straightforward to check that (A', C', f', g', h') is an exact couple. C' corresponds to the E1 term of the spectral sequence. We can iterate this procedure to get exact couples (A(n), C(n), f(n), g(n), h(n)).

In order to construct a spectral sequence, let En be C(n) and dn be g(n) o h(n).

Spectral sequences constructed with this method 

 Serre spectral sequence - used to compute (co)homology of a fibration
 Atiyah–Hirzebruch spectral sequence - used to compute (co)homology of extraordinary cohomology theories, such as K-theory
 Bockstein spectral sequence.
 Spectral sequences of filtered complexes

The spectral sequence of a filtered complex 

A very common type of spectral sequence comes from a filtered cochain complex, as it naturally induces a bigraded object. Consider a cochain complex  together with a descending filtration,   . We require that the boundary map is compatible with the filtration, i.e. , and that the filtration is exhaustive, that is, the union of the set of all  is the entire chain complex . Later, we will also assume that the filtration is Hausdorff or separated, that is, the intersection of the set of all  is zero.

The filtration is useful because it gives a measure of nearness to zero: As p increases,   gets closer and closer to zero.  We will construct a spectral sequence from this filtration where coboundaries and cocycles in later sheets get closer and closer to coboundaries and cocycles in the original complex.  This spectral sequence is doubly graded by the filtration degree p and the complementary degree .

Construction 
 has only a single grading and a filtration, so we first construct a doubly graded object for the first page of the spectral sequence. To get the second grading, we will take the associated graded object with respect to the filtration.  We will write it in an unusual way which will be justified at the  step:

 

and that we then have

In other words, the spectral sequence should satisfy

and we should have the relationship

The differential 
 

Unfortunately, the differential is not very explicit. Determining differentials or finding ways to work around them is one of the main challenges to successfully applying a spectral sequence.

Spectral sequences constructed with this method 

 Hodge–de Rham spectral sequence
 Spectral sequence of a double complex
 Can be used to construct Mixed Hodge structures

The spectral sequence of a double complex 

Another common spectral sequence is the spectral sequence of a double complex. A double complex is a collection of objects Ci,j for all integers i and j together with two differentials, d I and d II.  d I is assumed to decrease i, and d II is assumed to decrease j. Furthermore, we assume that the differentials anticommute, so that d I d II + d II d I = 0. We will do this by filtering our double complex in two different ways. Here are our filtrations:

To get a spectral sequence, we will reduce to the previous example. This is a complex because d I and d II are anticommuting differentials. The two filtrations on Ci,j give two filtrations on the total complex:

To show that these spectral sequences give information about the iterated homologies, we will work out the E0, E1, and E2 terms of the I filtration on T(C•,•).  The E0 term is clear:

where .

To find the E1 term, we need to determine d I + d II on E0. Notice that the differential must have degree −1 with respect to n, so we get a map

Consequently, the differential on E0 is the map Cp,q → Cp,q−1 induced by d I + d II.  But  d I has the wrong degree to induce such a map, so d I must be zero on E0. That means the differential is exactly d II, so we get

To find E2, we need to determine

Because E1 was exactly the homology with respect to d II, d II is zero on E1. Consequently, we get

Using the other filtration gives us a different spectral sequence with a similar E2 term:

What remains is to find a relationship between these two spectral sequences. It will turn out that as r increases, the two sequences will become similar enough to allow useful comparisons.

Convergence, degeneration, and abutment

Interpretation as a filtration of cycles and boundaries 
Let Er be a spectral sequence, starting with say r = 1. Then there is a sequence of subobjects

such that ; indeed, recursively we let  and let  be so that   are the kernel and the image of 

We then  let  and
;
it is called the limiting term. (Of course, such  need not exist in the category, but this is usually a non-issue since for example in the category of modules such limits exist or since in practice a spectral sequence one works with tends to degenerate; there are only finitely many inclusions in the sequence above.)

Terms of convergence 
We say a spectral sequence converges weakly if there is a graded object  with a filtration  for every , and for every  there exists an isomorphism .  It converges to  if the filtration  is Hausdorff, i.e. . We write

We say that a spectral sequence  abuts to  if for every  there is  such that for all , . Then  is the limiting term. The spectral sequence is regular or degenerates at  if the differentials  are zero for all . In symbols, we write:

The p indicates the filtration index. It is very common to write the  term on the left-hand side of the abutment, because this is the most useful term of most spectral sequences.

The five-term exact sequence of a spectral sequence relates certain low-degree terms and E∞ terms.

Examples of degeneration

The spectral sequence of a filtered complex, continued 

Notice that we have a chain of inclusions:

We can ask what happens if we define

 is a natural candidate for the abutment of this spectral sequence. Convergence is not automatic, but happens in many cases. In particular, if the filtration is finite and consists of exactly r nontrivial steps, then the spectral sequence degenerates after the rth sheet. Convergence also occurs if the complex and the filtration are both bounded below or both bounded above.

To describe the abutment of our spectral sequence in more detail, notice that we have the formulas:

To see what this implies for  recall that we assumed that the filtration was separated. For , recall that we assumed that the filtration was exhaustive. This implies that as r increases, the images grow until we reach . We conclude

,

that is, the abutment of the spectral sequence is the pth graded part of the (p+q)th homology of C. If our spectral sequence converges, then we conclude that:

Long exact sequences 

Using the spectral sequence of a filtered complex, we can derive the existence of long exact sequences. Choose a short exact sequence of cochain complexes 0 → A• → B• → C• → 0, and call the first map f• : A• → B•. We get natural maps of homology objects Hn(A•) → Hn(B•) → Hn(C•), and we know that this is exact in the middle. We will use the spectral sequence of a filtered complex to find the connecting homomorphism and to prove that the resulting sequence is exact.To start, we filter B•:

This gives:

The differential has bidegree (1, 0), so d0,q : Hq(C•) → Hq+1(A•). These are the connecting homomorphisms from the snake lemma, and together with the maps A• → B• → C•, they give a sequence:

It remains to show that this sequence is exact at the A and C spots.  Notice that this spectral sequence degenerates at the E2 term because the differentials have bidegree (2, −1). Consequently, the E2 term is the same as the E∞ term:

But we also have a direct description of the E2 term as the homology of the E1 term. These two descriptions must be isomorphic:

The former gives exactness at the C spot, and the latter gives exactness at the A spot.

The spectral sequence of a double complex, continued 

Using the abutment for a filtered complex, we find that:

In general, the two gradings on Hp+q(T(C•,•)) are distinct.  Despite this, it is still possible to gain useful information from these two spectral sequences.

Commutativity of Tor 

Let R be a ring, let M be a right R-module and N a left R-module. Recall that the derived functors of the tensor product are denoted Tor. Tor is defined using a projective resolution of its first argument. However, it turns out that . While this can be verified without a spectral sequence, it is very easy with spectral sequences.

Consider these as complexes which vanish in negative degree having differentials d and e, respectively. (The factor of −1 is so that the differentials anticommute.) Since projective modules are flat, taking the tensor product with a projective module commutes with taking homology, so we get:

Since the two complexes are resolutions, their homology vanishes outside of degree zero. In degree zero, we are left with

In particular, the  terms vanish except along the lines q = 0 (for the I spectral sequence) and p = 0 (for the II spectral sequence). This implies that the spectral sequence degenerates at the second sheet, so the E∞ terms are isomorphic to the E2 terms:

Finally, when p and q are equal, the two right-hand sides are equal, and the commutativity of Tor follows.

Worked-out examples

First-quadrant sheet 
If  and  can be chosen to be zero, this is called a first-quadrant spectral sequence.
To see this, note that either the domain or the codomain of the differential is zero for the considered cases. In visual terms, the sheets stabilize in a growing rectangle (see picture above). The spectral sequence need not degenerate, however, because the differential maps might not all be zero at once.

2 non-zero adjacent columns 
Let  be a homological spectral sequence such that  for all p other than 0, 1. Visually, this is the spectral sequence with -page

The differentials on the second page have degree (-2, 1), so they are of the form

These maps are all zero since they are
, 
hence the spectral sequence degenerates: .

such that . Thus, there is the exact sequence:
.
Next, let  be a spectral sequence whose second page consists only of two lines q = 0, 1. This need not degenerate at the second page but it still degenerates at the third page as the differentials there have degree (-3, 2). Note , as the denominator is zero. Similarly, . Thus,
.
Now, say, the spectral sequence converges to H with a filtration F as in the previous example. Putting everything together, one gets:

Wang sequence 
The computation in the previous section generalizes in a straightforward way. Consider a fibration over a sphere:

with n at least 2. There is the Serre spectral sequence:
;
that is to say,  with some filtration .

Since  is nonzero only when p is zero or n and equal to Z in that case, we see  consists of only two lines , hence the -page is given by

Moreover, since

Since the only non-zero differentials are on the -page, given by

which is

By computing  we get an exact sequence

and written out using the homology groups, this is

To establish what the two -terms are, write , and since , etc., we have:  and thus, since ,

This is the exact sequence

Putting all calculations together, one gets:

(The Gysin sequence is obtained in a similar way.)

Low-degree terms 
With an obvious notational change, the type of the computations in the previous examples can also be carried out for cohomological spectral sequence. Let  be a first-quadrant spectral sequence converging to H with the decreasing filtration

so that 
Since  is zero if p or q is negative, we have:

Since  for the same reason and since 
.
Since , . Stacking the sequences together, we get the so-called five-term exact sequence:

Edge maps and transgressions

Homological spectral sequences 
Let  be a spectral sequence. If  for every q < 0, then it must be that: for r ≥ 2,

as the denominator is zero. Hence, there is a sequence of monomorphisms:
.
They are called the edge maps. Similarly, if  for every p < 0, then there is a sequence of epimorphisms (also called the edge maps):
.
The transgression is a partially-defined map (more precisely, a map from a subobject to a quotient)

given as a composition , the first and last maps being the inverses of the edge maps.

Cohomological spectral sequences 
For a spectral sequence  of cohomological type, the analogous statements hold. If  for every q < 0, then there is a sequence of epimorphisms
.
And if  for every p < 0, then there is a sequence of monomorphisms:
.
The transgression is a not necessarily well-defined map:

Application 
Determining these maps are fundamental for computing many differentials in the Serre spectral sequence. For instance the transgression map determines the differential

for the homological spectral spectral sequence, hence on the Serre spectral sequence for a fibration  gives the map
.

Further examples 

Some notable spectral sequences are:

Topology and geometry 

 Atiyah–Hirzebruch spectral sequence of an extraordinary cohomology theory
Bar spectral sequence for the homology of the classifying space of a group.
Bockstein spectral sequence relating the homology with mod p coefficients and the homology reduced mod p.
Cartan–Leray spectral sequence converging to the homology of a quotient space.
Eilenberg–Moore spectral sequence for the singular cohomology of the pullback of a fibration
Serre spectral sequence of a fibration

Homotopy theory 

 Adams spectral sequence in stable homotopy theory
Adams–Novikov spectral sequence, a generalization to extraordinary cohomology theories.
Barratt spectral sequence converging to the homotopy of the initial space of a cofibration.
Bousfield–Kan spectral sequence converging to the homotopy colimit of a functor.
Chromatic spectral sequence for calculating the initial terms of the Adams–Novikov spectral sequence.
Cobar spectral sequence
EHP spectral sequence converging to stable homotopy groups of spheres
Federer spectral sequence converging to homotopy groups of a function space.
Homotopy fixed point spectral sequence
Hurewicz spectral sequence for calculating the homology of a space from its homotopy.
Miller spectral sequence converging to the mod p stable homology of a space.
Milnor spectral sequence is another name for the bar spectral sequence.
Moore spectral sequence is another name for the bar spectral sequence.
Quillen spectral sequence for calculating the homotopy of a simplicial group.
Rothenberg–Steenrod spectral sequence is another name for the bar spectral sequence.
van Kampen spectral sequence for calculating the homotopy of a wedge of spaces.

Algebra 

 Čech-to-derived functor spectral sequence from Čech cohomology to sheaf cohomology.
 Change of rings spectral sequences for calculating Tor and Ext groups of modules.
 Connes spectral sequences converging to the cyclic homology of an algebra.
 Gersten–Witt spectral sequence
Green's spectral sequence for Koszul cohomology
Grothendieck spectral sequence for composing derived functors
Hyperhomology spectral sequence for calculating hyperhomology.
Künneth spectral sequence for calculating the homology of a tensor product of differential algebras.
Leray spectral sequence converging to the cohomology of a sheaf.
Local-to-global Ext spectral sequence
Lyndon–Hochschild–Serre spectral sequence in group (co)homology
May spectral sequence for calculating the Tor or Ext groups of an algebra.
Spectral sequence of a differential filtered group: described in this article.
Spectral sequence of a double complex: described in this article.
Spectral sequence of an exact couple: described in this article.
Universal coefficient spectral sequence
van Est spectral sequence converging to relative Lie algebra cohomology.

Complex and algebraic geometry 
Arnold's spectral sequence in singularity theory.
Bloch–Lichtenbaum spectral sequence converging to the algebraic K-theory of a field.
Frölicher spectral sequence starting from the Dolbeault cohomology and converging to the algebraic de Rham cohomology of a variety.
Hodge–de Rham spectral sequence converging to the algebraic de Rham cohomology of a variety.
Motivic-to-K-theory spectral sequence

Notes

References

Introductory

References

Further reading

External links